Necrofauna are species that were previously extinct and have been biologically revived or recreated by the process of de-extinction.

Necrofauna are proxies or imitations of their former species and not identical replicas. Due to a number of technological, biological and environmental factors, they are considered a new type organism altogether. Revive & Restore, a nonprofit organization that supports pursuing de-extinction research with transparency to the public, describes the creation of necrofauna as a result of “transfer[ing] the genes that define the extinct species into the genome of the related species, effectively converting it into a living version of the extinct creature."

While the existence of necrofauna is still largely hypothetical, a Pyrenean ibex was the first and only animal to have undergone the de-extinction process with moderate success. The "unextinct" or revived animal was born, but then died several minutes later due to a lung defect.

Necrofauna and the de-extinction movement are highly controversial within conservation and scientific circles. Many conservationists argue that creating necrofauna could potentially distract from the urgency of saving endangered species that are still alive. Concerns have also been raised pertaining to the possible damaging impacts ecology could face in the wake of introducing a new species into an environment.

Etymology

The term necrofauna is a portmanteau consisting of two morphemes. The first morpheme, “necro,” comes from the Greek prefix necro, meaning death. “Fauna,” meanwhile, refers to the animals that inhabit a particular time period or environment and is derived from the Greek name Fauna, the Roman goddess of earth and fertility.

Alex Steffen is referred to as the first person to coin the neologism “necrofauna” in Jason Mark’s Earth Island Journal article titled “Back From the Dead.” The word was used in the context of describing the phenomenon of "charismatic necrofauna," which expresses the possibility that only certain charismatic species may be chosen as candidates for de-extinction based on human preferences, or that such resurrection efforts could distract from helping less "charismatic" species that are currently endangered.

References

Extinction
Conservation biology
Genetics